Tammy may refer to:
Tam o' Shanter (cap), a Scottish hat
Tammy (film series), a series of four films
Tammy and the Bachelor, the first film in the series
"Tammy" (song), a popular song from Tammy and the Bachelor
Tammy (TV series), a 1965 U.S. television comedy based on the series
 Tammy (film), a 2014 film (unrelated to the aforementioned series)
Tammy (comics), a British comic that ran from 1971 to 1984
Tammy (given name)
Tamara (given name)
Tammy (doll), a fashion doll created by the Ideal Toy Company in response to Mattel's Barbie doll
Tammy (cloth), a woven fabric
Tammy, a British girls' fashion store chain, purchased by and incorporated into Bhs stores after 2005

See also
Tammi (disambiguation)
Tami (disambiguation)
Tamis